Business.com is a digital media company and B2B web destination which offers various performance marketing advertising, including lead generation products on a pay per lead and pay per click basis, directory listings, and display advertising. The site covers business industry news and trends for growth companies and the B2B community to stay up-to-date, and hosted more than 15,000 pieces of content as of November 2014. Business.com operates as a subsidiary of the Purch Group since being acquired in 2016.

Having sold their brands to Future, Purch's existing B2B assets later reorganised into Business.com.

History 
Business.com, Inc. was founded in 1999 by Jake Winebaum, previously chairman of the Walt Disney Internet Group; and Sky Dayton, founder of Earthlink, Boingo Wireless, and Helio, among others.  Around that time, the Business.com domain name was purchased from Marc Ostrofsky by Winebaum's eCompanies Ventures for $7.5 million. In addition to investment by eCompanies, early funding in the amount of $61 million was provided in 2000 by Pearson PLC, Reed Business Information, McGraw Hill, and others. In its initial form, Business.com aimed to be the Internet's leading search engine for small business and corporate information.

Business.com struggled through the Dot-com bubble years. The company retooled beginning in 2002 after massive layoffs and a new focus on developing a pay for performance ad network model. In April 2003, the company achieved profitability, and on November 8, 2004, the company secured an additional $10 million in venture capital funding from Benchmark Capital.

On October 9, 2006, Business.com launched Work.com, a site with business how-to guides contributed by the small business community. Work.com was sold in March 2012 and is now owned by Salesforce.com.

Then on July 26, 2007, after beating out Dow Jones & Company, the New York Times Company, IAC/InterActiveCorp, and News Corp, print and interactive marketing company R.H. Donnelley Corporation announced plans to acquire Business.com in a deal valued at $345 million. The deal closed on August 23, 2007.

In June 2009, R.H. Donnelley filed for bankruptcy. The company emerged from Chapter 11 as Dex One Corporation on February 1, 2010.

In February 2011, Resource Nation acquired the brand and associated assets of Business.com to become one of the largest online destinations for business buyers looking for business-to-business (B2B) solutions. JMI Equity, a growth equity firm that specializes in investments in internet companies, provided funding in support of the transaction and the Company's ongoing growth.  Terms of the transactions were not disclosed.

In January 2013, the appointment of Tony Uphoff as CEO was announced. Uphoff was most recently CEO of UBM TechWeb and named a Top 100 business media exec by B2B Magazine and a "Top Media Innovator " by Mins B2B in 2009. In March 2013, Business.com launched a site refresh, new logo and new suite of products.

In August, 2014, the Business.com website was relaunched expanding beyond a home page and refresh that happened in March 2013. The backend technology was all updated including a new content management platform, in-house analytics, and big data platform to capture every behavior of the audience to deliver contextually relevant content based on the intent and navigation path. According to the CEO, a major emphasis was also put on responsive web design, removal of pages that were not valuable to the audience, and allowing a new content platform to drive the site experience.

In June 2016, Business.com was acquired by Purch Group. Business.com was not included in the Future plc acquisition of Purch's consumer properties.

Content
Business.com produces daily content, in which the staff reporters and market experts are featured. In 2014, the company's Daily Business Quote of the Day was featured by Time Inc. as one of the 27 Pinterest Boards that will make your life better. The market experts and staff provide insight for the latest news and discussions around marketing, human resources, technology, entrepreneurship, sales and finance. Market experts are outside contributors providing expertise and insights on trends happening in their perspective businesses. Market experts include Mike Volpe of Hubspot, Sarah benard of iCrossing and Aaron Kahlow of Online Marketing Institute (OMI).

The site also features content to help make a purchasing decision including comparison charts, white papers and case studies that are non-biased for the business buyer.

Products
Business.com serves advertisers looking to reach the growth companies audience characterized as 20-1000 employee size. Advertising customers include some of the largest B2B brands in B2B such as Intel, Salesforce, Marketo, ADP, Sprint as well as smaller brands. Its suite of digital marketing products include display advertising, pay per click, email marketing, content marketing demand generation, and lead generation for sales ready leads.

In December, 2014, the company launched LENS, a lead expansion and nurturing service, as part of their demand generation product set.

Awards and recognition
Business.com has been named as a Best Place to Work by the San Diego Business Journal in 2012, 2013, 2014. In October 2014, the website was ranked #1 on Inc.com's '50 Websites Your Startup Needs to Succeed'.

References

External links
 
business.com Blog
Business.com, Inc. company profile from BusinessWeek
Business.com's winding road, CNN's Money.com article based on an interview with Jake Winebaum.
Interview with Jake Winebaum, previous CEO of Business.com via socaltech.com
eCompanies venture capital site
JMI Equity web site

Privately held companies based in California
Internet search engines
Web directories
Companies based in Carlsbad, California